The Continental O-170 engine is the collective military designation for a family of small aircraft engines, known under the company designation of A50, A65, A75 and A80. The line was designed and built by Continental Motors commencing in the 1940s. It was employed as the powerplant for civil and military light aircraft.

The horizontally opposed, four-cylinder engines in this family are all identical in appearance, bore, stroke, dry weight, and piston displacement. All feature a bottom-mounted updraft carburetor fuel delivery system. The higher power variants differ only in compression ratio and maximum allowable rpm, plus minor modifications. The lower power versions are fully convertible to the higher rated versions.

Design and development

In all models of this family of engines the cylinder heads are of aluminum alloy, screwed and shrunk onto steel barrels. Spark plug inserts and intake valve seats are made from aluminum-bronze alloy, while the exhaust valve seats are steel. The engines all employ hydraulic tappets which operate in aluminum guides that are machined into the crankcase. The pushrods are steel and feature pressed-in ball ends.

Lubricating oil is delivered under pressure from the  oil sump to the drive bearings and the crankpins through the crankshaft. The cylinder walls and pistons are spray lubricated. Normal operating oil pressure is 35 psi, with minimum idle oil pressure 10 psi.

Variants

A50
, Compression ratio 5.4:1, max rpm 1,900, fuel consumption at cruise 3.8 US gph
A50-1
A50-2
A50-3
A50-4
A50-5
A50-6
A50-7
A65
, Compression ratio 6.3:1, max rpm 2,300, fuel consumption at cruise 4.4 US gph. The exhaust valves have stellite faces. The pistons have three rings, although some early production A65s had four piston rings.
A65-1
A65-2
A65-3
A65-4
A65-5
A65-6
A65-7
A65-8
A65-8F
A65-9:
A65-12
A75
, Compression ratio 6.3:1, max rpm 2,600, fuel consumption at cruise 4.8 US gph. The exhaust valves have stellite faces and the connecting rods have a  hole drilled in the rod cap to improve lubrication. The pistons have three rings and smaller piston pins.
A75-1
A75-2
A75-3
A75-4
A75-5
A75-6
A75-14
A80
, Compression ratio 7.55:1, max rpm 2,700, fuel consumption at cruise 5.2 US gph. The connecting rods have a  hole drilled in the rod cap to improve lubrication. The pistons have five rings and smaller piston pins.
A80-1
A80-2
A80-3
A80-4
A80-5
A80-6
A80-8
O-170
Military designation for the A50, A65, A75, A80 family of engines.
O-170-1
O-170-3
O-170-5
O-170-7

Applications
A50
Aeronca KCA
Aeronca 50C
Aeronca 50TC
Aeronca S50C
Luscombe 8
Piper J-3
Piper J-4
Porterfield CP50
Porterfield CP55
Taylorcraft BC
Taylorcraft BCS

A65

Aeronca L-3
Aeronca S65C
Aeronca S65CA
Aeronca 65F
Aeronca 65CA
Aeronca Champion
Airdrome Fokker D-VIII
Bearhawk LSA
Cassutt Special
Christavia Mk I
Circa Reproductions Nieuport
Coupé-Aviation JC-01
Davis DA-2
Davis DA-5
Ercoupe 415C
E & P Special
Falconar F11 Sporty
Fisher Celebrity
Fisher Dakota Hawk
Helmy Aerogypt
Henderson Little Bear
Interstate SIA Cadet
Jameson RJJ-1 Gipsy Hawk
Jodel D.112
Luscombe 8A
Luscombe 10
Piper J-3
Piper J-4A
Porterfield CP65
Rearwin Skyranger 165
Smith Miniplane
Stolp SA-900 V-Star
Taylorcraft BCS
Taylorcraft BCS12
Taylorcraft 65
Tayorcraft BC
Taylorcraft BC1265
Taylorcraft BCT
Taylorcraft L-2
Taylorcraft Tandem
Turner T-40
Warner Revolution I
Wolf W-11 Boredom Fighter

A75
Bearhawk LSA
Culver LCA
Jodel D.121
Luscombe 8C
Luscombe 8D
Piper J-4E
Piper J-5
Piper J-5A
Porterfield 75C
Rearwin Skyranger 175
Stinson Model 105 (HW-75)

A80
Harris Geodetic LW 108
Piper J-5A-80
Shirlen Big Cootie
Stinson Model 105 (HW-80)
Stinson Model 10
Vought V-173

Specifications (O-170-3 or A-65-8)

See also

Notes

References

Christy, Joe: Engines for Homebuilt Aircraft & Ultralights, pages 43–52. TAB Books, 1983. 

Boxer engines
1940s aircraft piston engines
O-170